The 1960 Boston Patriots season was the franchise's first season in the new American Football League. Led by head coach Lou Saban, the Patriots finished with five wins and nine losses, last in the AFL's Eastern Division. The team played their home games at Boston University Field (formerly the site of the Boston Braves' home ballpark Braves Field), later named "Nickerson Field."

Staff

Season summary 
In 1960, the inaugural season of the American Football League, the Patriots played in several important "firsts". The first-ever AFL pre-season game was played on the road against the Buffalo Bills on Saturday night, July 30, which Boston won. They hosted the inaugural regular season game, a Friday night 13–10 loss to the Denver Broncos at Boston University Field on September 9. The playing field was aligned along the first-base line. The Patriots started the season at 2–2, then lost three straight and won three straight in the middle of a five-game home stand to get back to .500 at 5–5, then ended the season on a four-game slide. They finished at 5–9, last in the AFL's Eastern Division, and second-worst in the eight-team league, ahead of Denver.

Butch Songin was the leading passer and Alan Miller was the leading rusher. Gino Cappelletti was a defensive back and placekicker the first year. Just before the final game, a receiver was slow getting back to the huddle, so Cappelletti filled in. He was impressive, and was a receiver for the rest of his career.

Season results 

Game 1: The Patriots lost to the Broncos 13–10 in the AFL season opener on Friday night. The Patriots struck first, with a 34-yard field goal in the first quarter. On the first play of the second quarter, Denver receiver Al Carmichael caught a pass in the flats and scampered 41 yards for a touchdown. In the third quarter, Bronco Gene Mingo took a punt 76 yards for a touchdown. Later in the quarter Patriot receiver Jim Colclough lost a fumble on the Denver 38. However, two plays later, Patriot defensive back Chuck Shonta took an interception 60 yards to the Denver 10, setting up a 10-yard touchdown pass from Butch Songin to Colclough in the right side of the end zone. In the fourth quarter, the Patriots seemed to be on a game-winning drive until an interception at the Denver two-yard line. The Broncos then ran sixteen plays to run out the clock.

Game 2: The Patriots won a thriller at the Polo Grounds against the Titans, 28–24. The Patriots dug themselves into a hole, down 24 to 7 in the fourth quarter. They were down 24–21 on the last play of the game. The center, Mike Hudock, gave a low snap to the Titans punter, who fumbled and Patriot Chuck Shonta picked it up and raced 52 yards for the game-winning score.

Game 3: The Patriots were shut out 13–0 against the Bills, the highlight being a 58-yard touchdown pass from Tommy O'Connell to Carl Smith.

Game 4: The Patriots won their first decisive win of the season against the Chargers in Los Angeles. It began with an 11-play drive capped by a Gino Cappelletti field goal. On the following kickoff, Charger Don Norton fumbled, leading to a quick touchdown for Boston. The Patriots followed it up with a 19-yard touchdown pass. On the next drive, Jim Crawford scored a touchdown, set up by a 78-yard Billy Wells reception. A Harry Jacobs interception set up a Wells touchdown, and another Boston field goal wrapped up the day, as the Patriots rolled over the Chargers 35–0.

Game 5: The Patriots, after their terrific win over the Chargers, were given a rude awakening in Oakland. On just the third play of game, Jack Larscheid scored on an 87-yard run, and the Patriots never regained the lead. The Raiders quickly built up a 27–14 lead with 11:45 left to go in the first quarter. However, the Patriots twice drove deep into Oakland territory, both times winding up with Butch Songin throwing interceptions. The Patriots were sloppy throughout the game, with multiple unnecessary penalties and turnovers.

Game 6: The Patriots dropped a game that should have been theirs. Early in the third quarter, the Patriots led 24–0. Boston had dominated, with three Songin touchdown passes and a field goal. The Broncos were down but not out, and rallied back to stun the Patriots. In the last quarter and a half, the Broncos scored 31 unanswered points to win the game. Broncos quarterback Frank Tripucka lead the way, completing four touchdown passes to three different receivers. The game is still one of the largest deficits that a Patriot opponent has come back from to win.

Game 7: After an embarrassing loss several weeks before, the Chargers had revenge on their minds. They got it. The Chargers won the game by the time the first half arrived. When Paul Maguire fell on a fumble in the end zone early in the third quarter, they matched the 35-point lead the Patriots had in the previous game. Despite the Patriots' two following touchdowns, the Chargers ran over the Patriots 45–16.

Game 8: The Patriots faced the Raiders in a must-win game. The Patriots dominated throughout three quarters, aided by three Songin passing touchdowns. Boston held a 31 to 14 lead entering the fourth quarter, and seemed to be on the verge of their third win of season. The Raiders tried to pull off a similar comeback that the Broncos had two games earlier. The Raiders scored twice on running plays, and were soon driving for the game winning score. The Patriots managed to avoid a loss or tie, intercepting future Patriot quarterback Babe Parilli with just under two minutes to go. The Patriots had won just their third game of the season and their first on their home field. The game is noteworthy for having the lowest attendance of any regular season game in Patriots history at only 8,446.

Game 12: The Patriots hosted the Houston Oilers in what would be the first sellout game in American Football League history.

Standings

Roster 

All of the following players appeared in at least one game for the 1960 Boston Patriots.

Starters 

The following players started the most games at their respective positions:

References 
General
 . For game-by-game results
 . For team roster
 . For season summary
Notes

Boston Patriots
New England Patriots seasons
Boston Patriots
1960s in Boston